Our Delights is an album by pianists Tommy Flanagan and Hank Jones recorded in 1978 for the Galaxy label.

Reception

AllMusic awarded the album 4 stars, stating: "Piano duets have the potential danger of getting overcrowded and a bit incoherent, but neither happens on this rather delightful set. ...tasteful, consistently swinging and inventive within the tradition".

Track listing
 "Our Delight" (Tadd Dameron) - 5:08
 "Autumn Leaves" (Joseph Kosma, Jacques Prévert, Johnny Mercer) - 5:39
 "Robbins Nest" (Illinois Jacquet, Charles Thompson) - 7:19
 "Jordu" (Duke Jordan) - 5:01
 "Confirmation" (Charlie Parker) - 5:17
 "A Child Is Born" (Thad Jones) - 6:19
 "Lady Bird" (Dameron) - 3:53
 "Robbins Nest" [Alternate Take] (Jacquet, Thompson) - 7:28  Bonus track on CD reissue

Personnel 
Tommy Flanagan, Hank Jones  - piano

References 

1979 albums
Tommy Flanagan albums
Hank Jones albums
Galaxy Records albums